Thompson-Harding Monument is a public artwork by an unknown artist, located at Rock Creek Cemetery in Washington, D.C., United States. The monument was originally surveyed as part of the Smithsonian's Save Outdoor Sculpture! survey in 1993.

Description

This two sided sculpture's focal point is a large granite cross placed upon three granite steps. On the north side of the cross stands a full-size portrait of N. Elbridge Thompson and on the opposite side is a full-size portrait of Lillie May Harding. Thompson wears a suit with a long jacket, vest and bow tie. He has sideburns, a mustache and a beard. Harding wears a long dress with intricate carvings of lace on the borders. She has long hair which lies over her proper right shoulder and in her proper left hand she holds a lily.

The north side of the monument is engraved: THOMPSON
The south side of the monument is engraved: HARDING

The west side of the base is engraved:
ERECTED BY ELLEN J. THOMPSON
AND S. ELIZABETH HARDING

Gallery

Information

This monument was erected by members of both families. Lillie May Harding died in 1897 at the age of twenty-seven.

The Washington Post described the monument in 1977 as follows: "a rugged cross, an angel in the act of dropping a stone flower, and a statue of a portly gentleman trying hard to look celestial in a coat and tails."

Condition

This sculpture was surveyed in 1993 for its condition and it was described as needing treatment.

References

Monuments and memorials in Washington, D.C.
Outdoor sculptures in Washington, D.C.
Burials at Rock Creek Cemetery
Marble sculptures in Washington, D.C.
1898 sculptures